

M03A Muscle relaxants, peripherally acting agents

M03AA Curare alkaloids
M03AA01 Alcuronium
M03AA02 Tubocurarine
M03AA04 Dimethyltubocurarine

M03AB Choline derivatives
M03AB01 Suxamethonium

M03AC Other quaternary ammonium compounds
M03AC01 Pancuronium
M03AC02 Gallamine
M03AC03 Vecuronium
M03AC04 Atracurium
M03AC05 Hexafluronium
M03AC06 Pipecuronium bromide
M03AC07 Doxacurium chloride
M03AC08 Fazadinium bromide
M03AC09 Rocuronium bromide
M03AC10 Mivacurium chloride
M03AC11 Cisatracurium

M03AX Other muscle relaxants, peripherally acting agents
M03AX01 Botulinum toxin

M03B Muscle relaxants, centrally acting agents

M03BA Carbamic acid esters
M03BA01 Phenprobamate
M03BA02 Carisoprodol
M03BA03 Methocarbamol
M03BA04 Styramate
M03BA05 Febarbamate
M03BA51 Phenprobamate, combinations excluding psycholeptics
M03BA52 Carisoprodol, combinations excluding psycholeptics
M03BA53 Methocarbamol, combinations excluding psycholeptics
M03BA71 Phenprobamate, combinations with psycholeptics
M03BA72 Carisoprodol, combinations with psycholeptics
M03BA73 Methocarbamol, combinations with psycholeptics
QM03BA99 Combinations

M03BB Oxazol, thiazine, and triazine derivatives
M03BB02 Chlormezanone
M03BB03 Chlorzoxazone
M03BB52 Chlormezanone, combinations excluding psycholeptics
M03BB53 Chlorzoxazone, combinations excluding psycholeptics
M03BB72 Chlormezanone, combinations with psycholeptics
M03BB73 Chlorzoxazone, combinations with psycholeptics

M03BC Ethers, chemically close to antihistamines
M03BC01 Orphenadrine (citrate)
M03BC51 Orphenadrine, combinations

M03BX Other centrally acting agents
M03BX01 Baclofen
M03BX02 Tizanidine
M03BX03 Pridinol
M03BX04 Tolperisone
M03BX05 Thiocolchicoside
M03BX06 Mephenesin
M03BX07 Tetrazepam
M03BX08 Cyclobenzaprine
M03BX09 Eperisone
M03BX30 Phenyramidol
M03BX53 Pridinol, combinations
M03BX55 Thiocolchicoside, combinations
QM03BX90 Guaifenesin

M03C Muscle relaxants, directly acting agents

M03CA Dantrolene and derivatives
M03CA01 Dantrolene

References

M03